Edward Cooke may refer to:

Edward Cooke (Royal Navy officer) (1772–1799)
Ed Cooke (author) (born 1982), British writer
Ed Cooke (American football) (born 1935), American football defensive end
Ed Cooke (Australian footballer) (1910–1988), Australian rules footballer
Edward Cooke (1755–1820), British politician and pamphleteer
Edward Cooke (Roundhead) (died 1683), English politician who sat in the House of Commons in 1659
Edward Cooke (sailor), who wrote the 1712 book A Voyage to the South Sea, and Round the World
Edward Cooke (swimmer), Australian swimmer
Edward D. Cooke (1849–1897), U.S. Representative from Illinois
Edward William Cooke (1811–1880), English painter
John Cooke (footballer, born 1942) (Edward John Cooke, born 1942), English soccer player

See also
Edward Cook (disambiguation)
Edward Coke (disambiguation) (pronounced Cook)